Tylopilus williamsii is a bolete fungus in the family Boletaceae found in Mexico, where it grows under oak. It was described as new to science in 1991.

See also
List of North American boletes

References

External links

williamsii
Fungi described in 1991
Fungi of Mexico
Fungi without expected TNC conservation status